Fort Erie Transit provides local accessible bus service to the inhabitants of Fort Erie, Ontario, Canada, just across the Peace Bridge and the Niagara River from Buffalo, New York.

The Town of Fort Erie has provided public transit service since 1977. Public transit is 100% accessible and meets Accessibility for Ontarians with Disabilities (AODA) legislation and standards. TOK Transit (originally Can-ar Coach Service) has operated Fort Erie Transit since 2012.

Services

FETransit Schedule & Route
Regular operation consists of three routes served by three buses, running approximately (in each direction along headways) once every two hours. The routes serve Fort Erie, Crystal Beach, Ridgeway, Stevensville and Black Creek and many neighbourhoods and areas in between.

FAST
Fort Erie Accessible Specialized Transit (FAST) provides transportation for those unable to walk 175 metres or board a regular Fort Erie Transit bus. The FAST service is operated by the Canadian Red Cross Niagara on behalf of the Town of Fort Erie.

Niagara Specialized Transit
This service is for eligible residents of Niagara Region who need to travel between municipalities for medical appointments, employment or education purposes.

Intercity service
As of September 2, 2008, Niagara Transit started operating service from Niagara Falls into Fort Erie, connecting with the Fort Erie Transit bus at the Municipal HUB at 3 Municipal Centre Drive, Fort Erie.

Private intercity coach services are primarily operated by Coach Canada with connections to St. Catharines and Toronto. The terminus is located at Robo Mart, 21 Princess Street at Waterloo Street.

See also

 Public transport in Canada

References 

Transit agencies in Ontario
Transport in Fort Erie, Ontario